{{infobox road
| country= PAK
| type=M
| route=8
| length_km= 892
| length_ref= 
| direction_a=East
| direction_b=West
| terminus_a='Sukkur| cities=Khuzdar
karkh' />AwaranHoshabTurbat<br
/>Shahdadkot| terminus_b=Gwadar| junction= N-55 National Highway N-10 National Highway
| maint= National Highway Authority & Frontier Works Organisation
| map=
| ahn =
}}

The M-8''' is an east–west motorway in Pakistan, connecting Sukkur- Larkana to Gwadar. The motorway is partly currently under-construction, while the 193 kilometre stretch between Gwadar and Hoshab was inaugurated in February 2016.  A timeline for the completion of the motorway is not available due to the difficult terrain in which the motorway is being constructed.

Route 
The Ratodero Gwadar Motorway (M-8) will start from Ratodero in Sindh Province and enter Balochistan Province passing near the towns of Khuzdar, Awaran, Hoshab, Turbat before joining the Makran Coastal Highway just east of the port city of Gwadar. The M8 will cross the Dasht River and pass near the Mirani Dam in Balochistan Province. The M8 will have 4-lanes and a total length of 892 km. Initially, 2-lanes will be constructed after the completion of which another 2-lanes will be added, thus making a total of 4-lanes.

Construction 

The M8 is being constructed by Pakistan's National Highway Authority. Construction of the M8 commenced on 15 October 2004. According to a newspaper report of July 23, 2015 the construction arm of Pakistan army, Frontier Works Organization (FWO) has completed 502 of 870 kilometer of this road.
The work started simultaneously from the junction with the Makran Coastal Highway (MCH) and from Ratodero in Sindh. As of January 2015 the road is completed except for some bridges from MCH to a point near Hoshab where it joins N85 (Hoshab-Panjgur-Besima Highway) and Hoshab-Bela Road. The M8 Motorway will be following the alignment of N85. From the Ratodero end M8 to Khuzdar is almost complete except for a difficult section going over the peaks of northern Kirthar range about 70 km east of Khuzdar.

CPEC 
M8 motorway is part of CPEC central route. Half of the motorway from Gwadar to Hoshab is operational with two lanes. The other two lanes will be added after M8 is fully operational. The motorway is operated by NHA & FWO.
On 16 July 2020, ECNEC awarded Rs26bn for 146 km Hoshab-Awaran-Khuzdar Section.

Junctions

Images

See also
 China-Pakistan Economic Corridor
 Motorways of Pakistan
 National Highways of Pakistan
 Transport in Pakistan
 National Highway Authority

References

External links
 National Highway Authority
 Pakistan National Highways & Motorway Police

M08
Proposed roads in Pakistan
China–Pakistan Economic Corridor